Savoy blue or savoy azure ( or ) is a shade of saturated blue between peacock blue and periwinkle, lighter than peacock blue. It owes its name to the fact of being the color of the House of Savoy, a ruling dynasty in the County of Savoy from 1003 to 1416, the Duchy of Savoy from 1416 to 1714, the Kingdom of Piedmont-Sardinia from 1720 to 1861, and the Kingdom of Italy from 1861 to 1946.

Having become a national color with the unification of Italy (1859–70), its use continued even after the birth of the Italian Republic (1946) with the name "Italian blue". An Italian-blue border is in fact inserted on the edge of the Presidential Standard of Italy, and the use of the blue scarf for the Italian Armed Forces' officers, for the presidents of the Italian provinces during the official ceremonies, and of the blue jersey for Italian national sports teams it was also maintained in the Republican era.

Historical origin

The origin of the color seems to date back to June 20, 1366 when Amadeus VI, Count of Savoy, before leaving for a crusade commissioned by Pope Urban V and organized to help the Byzantine emperor John V Palaiologos, cousin of a maternal part of the Savoy Count, wanted that on the flagship of the fleet of 17 ships and 2000 men, a galley of Republic of Venice, waved, next to the red-crusading silver banner of the Savoys, a blue flag:

The color therefore has a Marian implication, bearing in mind that there is also the possibility that the use of a blue banner by the Savoys started earlier. In any case the oldest documented Savoy flags, dating back to 1589, have the colors red, white (or the colors of the coat of arms of the dynasty) and blue. The latter color acquired over time prevalence until it became the Italian national color.

Use

Referring to the Marian devotions, the ribbons of the Order of the Annunciation (the greatest Savoyard knight sign, transplanted also in the kingdom of Italy), were blue; blues, also in the Republican era, are also the ribbons of the decorations of military valor (gold, silver, bronze medal and the war cross).

Later, even for the officers, a blue scarf was provided in the outfit, dressed as a neck-band passing over the right shoulder and knotted on the left side. In 1572 this use was made obligatory for all the officers by Emmanuel Philibert, Duke of Savoy. Through various transformations, the savoy blue scarf is still the main rank of the Italian armed forces' officers, who dress it both in ceremonial services and, sometimes, on guard.

Other uses in the Republican era of color are the border of the Italian presidential banner (blue, in heraldry, means "law" and "command") as well as on the institutional flags of some primary public offices (President of the Council of Ministers, minister and undersecretary of defense, high degrees of the Italian Navy and of the Italian Air Force), as well as on the distinctive range of the presidents of the Italian provinces, on the Italian blue cockade and on the aircraft used by the Frecce Tricolori.

In the sporting field, the blue of Savoy distinguishes almost all of the athletes who represent Italy internationally in any discipline: the origin of the use of this color dates back to 6 January 1911, when the Italy national football team faced in Milan the Hungary national football team. The term blue shirt by now represents for metonymy the international appearance for Italy, and the athletes who represent the country are called Azzurri.

There is no univocal color coding of the blue links, so that the shade of blue is historically varied over time both within the same national team and, for example, in the same historical era between national teams of different disciplines.

Other shades of color

See also 
 National symbols of Italy
 Rosso corsa

Notes

Citations

References 

 
 

 

Shades of blue
National symbols of Italy